The Sanremo Music Festival 2001 was the 51st annual Sanremo Music Festival, held at the Teatro Ariston in Sanremo, province of Imperia, between 26 February and 3 March 2001 and broadcast by Rai 1.

The show was presented by Raffaella Carrà, assisted by Megan Gale, Massimo Ceccherini and Enrico Papi.

The winner of the Big Artists section was Elisa with the song "Luce (Tramonti a nord est)", which also won the Mia Martini Critics Award.

The group Gazosa won the "Newcomers" section with the song "Stai con me (Forever)".

The quality jury consisted of Gino Paoli (who served as president), Iva Zanicchi, Margherita Buy, Francesca Archibugi, Omar Calabrese,  Piero Chiambretti,  Saverio Marconi, Alberto Testa, Giovanni Veronesi and Piero Vivarelli.
 
After every night,  Enrico Papi and Raffaella Carrà hosted Dopo il festival tutti da me, a talk show about the Festival with the participation of singers and journalists.

Participants and results

Big Artists

Newcomers

Guests

References 

Sanremo Music Festival by year
2001 in Italian music
2001 music festivals
2001 in Italian television